NLI may refer to:

 National Library of Iran
 National Library of Ireland
 National Library of Israel
 National Library of India
 Northern Light Infantry
 National Letter of Intent
 Native-language identification